Idelson is a lunar impact crater that is located on the far side of the Moon. It lies just behind the southern lunar limb, in a region that is sometimes brought into view of the Earth due to libration. Idel'son is situated to the southwest of the huge walled plain Schrödinger.

The northern rim of Idelson is overlain by the larger crater Ganswindt, reversing the usual order of smaller craters on top of larger impacts usually seen on the Moon. The outer glacis of Ganswindt covers nearly half the interior floor of Idelson, reaching to the midpoint. The remainder of the interior and rim of the crater has been partly overlain by ejecta, producing a rounded, lumpy surface. Still the surviving outer rim remains distinct, and is not overlain by any other impacts of note. The largest impact within the interior is a tiny crater next to the southeastern inner wall.

Satellite craters 

By convention these features are identified on lunar maps by placing the letter on the side of the crater midpoint that is closest to Idelson.

References 

 
 
 
 
 
 
 
 
 
 
 
 

Impact craters on the Moon